Fitoterapia is a peer-reviewed medical journal covering research on the use of medicinal plants and bioactive natural products of plant origin in pharmacotherapy.

According to the Journal Citation Reports, Fitoterapia has a 2021 impact factor of 3.204. Since 2023 the Editor in Chief is prof. Orazio Taglialatela-Scafati.

References

External links 
 

English-language journals
Elsevier academic journals
Publications established in 1930
Pharmacology journals